Corrado Sanguineti (born 7 November 1964) has been since 16 November 2015 the elected Bishop of Pavia. He replaced the most rev. Giovanni Giudici.

Biography 

Born in 1964, he entered on seminar of Chiavari and was ordained priest on 30 October 1988. He became pro-vicar general of diocese of Chiavari.

He was appointed bishop of Pavia on 16 November 2015, and will be ordained on 9 January 2016.

He will install on Pavia see on 24 January 2016.

Note

Resources
Profile of Mons. Sanguineti www.catholic-hierarchy.org
Official page of diocese of Pavia

1964 births
Living people
Bishops of Pavia
20th-century Italian Roman Catholic bishops
Clergy from Milan
Place of birth missing (living people)